Trepadonia is a genus of flowering plants belonging to the family Asteraceae.

Its native range is Peru.

Species:
 Trepadonia mexiae (H.Rob.) H.Rob. 
 Trepadonia oppositifolia H.Rob. & H.Beltrán

References

Asteraceae
Asteraceae genera